Helen Craig (May 13, 1912 – July 20, 1986) was an American actress, perhaps best known for her role on Broadway as the main character, Belinda, in Johnny Belinda.

Early years
The daughter of copper executive Edward A. Craig, Helen Craig was born on May 13, 1912 in San Antonio, Texas. She had a sister, Marian, and two brothers, Robert and Edward Jr.

Television
As well as films, Craig appeared in numerous plays, and on television she had frequent appearances in The Waltons, Kojak and The Bionic Woman.

Stage
Craig was "a graduate of the Orson Welles' celebrated Mercury Theatre". Her Broadway credits include Russet Mantle (1936), Soliloquy (1938), The Unconquered (1940), Johnny Belinda (1940), As You Like It (1941), Lute Song (1946), Land's End (1946), The House of Bernarda Alba (1951), Diamond Orchid (1965), and More Stately Mansions (1967).

Her work in Johnny Belinda required her to learn sign language, which she used throughout the play as she portrayed the deaf title character. She also had to learn to not react to lines spoken by other actors in the play. Preparation for the role included four weeks' study with a teacher who read the script and taught Craig the appropriate signs.

Personal life
Craig was married to actor John Beal from 1934 until her death. They had two daughters, Theodora Emily and Tandy Johanna.

Death
Craig died of cardiac arrest on July 20, 1986 in New York City, aged 74.

Partial filmography
 The Snake Pit (1948)
 They Live by Night (1948)
 The Sporting Club (1971)
 Rancho Deluxe (1975)
 The Legend of Lizzie Borden (1975)
 Heroes (1977)

References

External links
 

1912 births
1986 deaths
Actresses from San Antonio
American film actresses
American stage actresses
American television actresses
20th-century American actresses